Gyalpo Losar is a new year festival of Sherpa people of Nepal and Sikkim and Darjeeling. The festival is celebrated every year from Falgun Shukla Pratipada, the second day of the waxing moon until the full moon.

Gyalpo Losar is also regarded as a Tibetan New Year. The calendar has a cycle of 12 years named after mouse, cow, tiger, rabbit, dragon, snake, horse, sheep, monkey, bird, dog and boar.

Mythology
According to mythology, the Losar was first celebrated when an old woman named Belma introduced moon based time measurement. People went to the local spring to perform rituals of gratitude and offerings were made to the Nagas (the snake god), or water spirits, who activated the water element in the area, and smoke offerings were made to the local spirits associated with the natural world.

History
Gyalpo Losar was celebrated as a spring festival from the reign of Pude Gungyal, the ninth emperor of Tibet.

Activities
Gyalpo Losar is celebrated for 2 weeks. The main celebrations take place during first three days. On the first day, a traditional beverage called Changkol, an equivalent of Chhaang is drunk. In the second day, which is the start of new year, Gyalpo Losar is celebrated. On the third day, people gather together to have a feast.

Various traditional dances representing the struggle between demon and god are performed in the Monasteries. Mantras are chanted and holy torches are passed among all the people in the crowd.  A traditional dance depicting a battle between a deer and the King is also performed.

Traditional dishes are served during the festival. One of the main dishes is a soup called Gutung cooked with nine kinds of beans and meat, wheat, rice, sweet potato, cheese, peas, green pepper, vermicelli noodles and radish. The soup is served with dumpling. Khapse, a deep-fried pastry commonly eaten during, symbolizing the start of holiday celebrations.

Firecrackers are fired to get rid of ill spirits. Traditional dances such as Syabru are performed.

See also
Sonam Losar, new year of Hyolmo people
Tamu Losar, new year of Gurung people
Losar, new year of Tibet people

References

Festivals in Nepal
New Year celebrations
Buddhist festivals in Nepal
Buddhist festivals in India
New Year in India
Sherpa culture